John Dimitri Negroponte (born July 21, 1939) is an American diplomat. He is currently a James R. Schlesinger Distinguished Professor at the Miller Center for Public Affairs at the University of Virginia.  He is a former J.B. and Maurice C. Shapiro Professor of International Affairs at the George Washington University's Elliott School of International Affairs. Prior to this appointment, he served as a research fellow and lecturer in international affairs at Yale University's Jackson Institute for Global Affairs, United States Deputy Secretary of State (2007–2009), and the first ever Director of National Intelligence (2005–2007).

Negroponte served in the United States Foreign Service from 1960 to 1997. From 1981 to 1996, he had tours of duty as United States ambassador in Honduras, Mexico, and the Philippines. After leaving the Foreign Service, he subsequently served in the Bush Administration as U.S. permanent representative to the United Nations from 2001 to 2004, and was ambassador to Iraq from June 2004 to April 2005. In November 2010, some of Negroponte's letters were released on the website WikiLeaks.

Early life and education
Negroponte was born in London, United Kingdom, on July 21, 1939, to Greek parents  (1915–1996) and Catherine Coumantaros Negroponte (1916–2000). His father was a Greek shipping magnate and alpine skier who competed in the 1936 Winter Olympics. Negroponte attended the Allen-Stevenson School and The Buckley School and graduated from Phillips Exeter Academy in 1956 and Yale University in 1960. He was a member of Fence Club (Psi Upsilon fraternity), alongside William H. T. Bush, the brother of President George H. W. Bush, and Porter Goss, who served as Director of Central Intelligence and Director of the Central Intelligence Agency under Negroponte from 2005 to 2006.

After less than a semester at Harvard Law School, Negroponte joined the Foreign Service in 1960. He served at eight different Foreign Service posts in Asia (including the U.S. Embassy, Saigon), Europe and Latin America, and he also held important positions at the State Department and the White House. As a young Foreign Service officer—one of the few men in Washington who dared to openly disagree with Henry Kissinger's secret handling of the Vietnam peace talks—Negroponte attempted to convince his superior that any peace agreement negotiated without the consent of South Vietnam's leader Nguyen Van Thieu would be doomed to failure. Seymour Hersh claims in his book The Price of Power that Kissinger never forgave Negroponte, and, upon becoming Secretary of State, exiled him to Quito, Ecuador. Ironically, this was to be the beginning of Negroponte's long distinguished career as an ambassador. In 1981, he became the U.S. Ambassador to Honduras. From 1985 to 1987, Negroponte held the position of Assistant Secretary of State for Oceans and International Environmental and Scientific Affairs. Subsequently, he served as Deputy Assistant to the President for National Security Affairs, from 1987 to 1989; Ambassador to Mexico, from 1989 to 1993; and Ambassador to the Philippines from 1993 to 1996. As Deputy National Security Advisor to President Ronald Reagan, he was involved in the campaign to remove from power General Manuel Noriega in Panama. From 1997 until his appointment as ambassador to the U.N., Negroponte was an executive with McGraw-Hill.

Career

Ambassador to Honduras (1981–1985)

From 1981 to 1985, Negroponte was the U.S. ambassador to Honduras. During this time, military aid to Honduras grew from $4 million to $77.4 million a year, and the US began to maintain a significant military presence there, with the goal of overthrowing the revolutionary Sandinista government of Nicaragua, which had overthrown the Somoza dictatorship in a civil war. 

The previous U.S. ambassador to Honduras, Jack Binns, who was appointed by President Jimmy Carter, made numerous complaints about human rights abuses by the Honduran Army under the government of Policarpo Paz García. After the inauguration of Ronald Reagan, Binns was replaced by Negroponte, who has denied any knowledge of wrongdoing by the Honduran Army.

In 1995, The Baltimore Sun published an extensive investigation of U.S. activities in Honduras. Speaking of Negroponte and other senior U.S. officials, an ex-Honduran congressman, Efraín Díaz, was quoted as saying:

Their attitude was one of tolerance and silence. They needed Honduras to loan its territory more than they were concerned about innocent people being killed.

Substantial evidence subsequently emerged to support the contention that Negroponte knew serious violations of human rights were being committed by the Honduran government, but despite this he did not recommend ending U.S. military aid to Honduras. Senator Christopher Dodd of Connecticut, on September 14, 2001, as reported in the Congressional Record, aired his suspicions on the occasion of Negroponte's nomination to the position of UN ambassador:

Based upon the Committee's review of State Department and CIA documents, it would seem that Ambassador Negroponte knew far more about human rights abuses perpetrated by the Honduran government than he chose to share with the committee in 1989 or in embassy contributions at the time to annual State Department Human Rights reports.

Among other evidence, Dodd cited a 1985 cable sent by Negroponte that made it clear that Negroponte was aware of the threat of "future human rights abuses" by "secret operating cells" left over by General Gustavo Álvarez Martínez, the chief of the Honduran armed forces, after he was forcibly removed from his post by fellow military commanders in 1984. The cables reveal that Negroponte repeatedly urged reform of the Honduran criminal code and justice system to replace arbitrary measures taken by the Honduran government after events such as the destruction of the nation's main power plant at Tegucigalpa and the abduction of the entire business establishment of San Pedro Sula, Honduras' second largest city, in 1982. Negroponte's predecessor as Ambassador, Carter appointee Jack Binns acknowledged that human rights abuses committed by the Honduran Army were supported by military assistance from the Argentine junta and the CIA during the Carter administration, and that neither the Honduran government nor the CIA kept the embassy informed of what it was doing. The scale of the carnage in Honduras was limited to less than 300 'disappearances' during the five years of the Negroponte and Binns ambassadorships as compared with 70,000 lost lives as a result of civil war and repression in El Salvador, notwithstanding that Honduras was involved in a low-level civil war punctuated at times by invasions of its territory.

In April 2005, as the Senate confirmation hearings for the National Intelligence post were held, hundreds of documents were released by the State Department in response to a FOIA request by The Washington Post. The documents, cables that Negroponte sent to Washington while serving as ambassador to Honduras, indicated that he played a more active role than previously known in managing US efforts against the leftist Sandinista government next door in Nicaragua. According to the Post, the image of Negroponte that emerges from the cables is that of an:

exceptionally energetic, action-oriented ambassador whose anti-communist convictions led him to downplay human rights abuses in Honduras, the most reliable U.S. ally in the region. There is little in the documents the State Department has released so far to support his assertion that he used "quiet diplomacy" to persuade the Honduran authorities to investigate the most egregious violations, including the mysterious disappearance of dozens of government opponents.

The New York Times wrote that the documents revealed:
 
a tough cold warrior who enthusiastically carried out President Ronald Reagan's strategy. They show he sent admiring reports to Washington about the Honduran Army chief, who was blamed for human rights violations, warned that peace talks with the Nicaraguan government might be a dangerous "Trojan horse" and pleaded with officials in Washington to impose greater secrecy on the Honduran role in aiding the contras.

The cables show that Mr. Negroponte worked closely with William J. Casey, then director of central intelligence, on the Reagan administration's anti-Communist offensive in Central America. He helped word a secret 1983 presidential "finding" authorizing support for the Contras, as the Nicaraguan rebels were known, and met regularly with Honduran military officials to win and retain their backing for the covert action.

Both papers based their stories on cables obtained by a Post FOIA request. George Washington University's National Security Archive writes of:

dozens of cables in which the Ambassador sought to undermine regional peace efforts such as the Contadora initiative that ultimately won Costa Rican president Oscar Arias a Nobel Prize, as well as multiple reports of meetings and conversations with Honduran military officers who were instrumental in providing logistical support and infrastructure for CIA covert operations in support of the contras against Nicaragua—"our special project" as Negroponte refers to the contra war in the cable traffic.

Negroponte was opposed to early drafts of peace settlements on the ground that they would have left undisturbed what he described as an enormous threat presented by expansion of the Nicaraguan armed forces with Soviet and Cuban aid. In his tenure in Honduras, Negroponte steered a middle course between State Department and journalistic critics who favored a policy of nonresistance to the militarization of the Sandinista regime to power Nicaragua and its aid to rebel movements in Honduras and El Salvador and 'hard line' persons within the Reagan administration who would have involved the United States in Central America through actions such as blockades, bombing of Nicaraguan airfields, the provision of offensive weapons, and the installation of permanent military bases. A study of American policy has noted that "the United States had a great deal to do with the preservation of Honduran stability. Had it not been for U.S. enticements and pressures elections probably would not have been held in 1980 and 1981. The perpetuation of the military dictatorship would have undermined the legitimacy of the political order, making it far more vulnerable to revolutionary turmoil. By the same token, strong North American opposition to President Suazo's attempt to remain in power in 1985 helped preserve the fragile legitimacy that had been built over the preceding five years ... massive economic aid prevented the economy's collapse ... without the United States, it might well have disintegrated into chaos." Following Bush-Gorbachev meetings beginning in 1986, both the U.S. and the Soviet Union ended military support for 'proxy wars', in Central America, and free elections in Nicaragua, Honduras and El Salvador followed. Senator Bill Bradley regarded the whole episode as "a minor issue--the supply of arms to the Nicaraguan contras, a policy that took on monumental proportions inside the Beltway and upon those liberals who saw another quagmire in every exercise of military power."

Assistant Secretary for Environment, Oceans and Fisheries (1985–1989)
In this posting, Negroponte together with Ambassador Richard Benedick negotiated the Montreal Protocol on Ozone, the most successful modern environmental treaty, overcoming opposition from Europe, Russia, and China and from some Reagan administration officials. (R. Benedick, Ozone Diplomacy: New Directions in Safeguarding the Planet (Cambridge, Mass.: Harvard, 1998), 101) He also fostered scientific cooperation with the Soviet Union clashing with 'hard liners' like Richard Perle as well as two treaties relating to cooperation in dealing with nuclear accidents in the wake of the Chernobyl disaster.

Ambassador to Mexico (1989–1993)
During Negroponte's tour as US Ambassador to Mexico, he was instrumental in persuading the Bush administration to respond to a Mexican initiative by negotiating the North American Free Trade Agreement despite initial opposition by the U.S. Office of Trade Representative. His tenure in Mexico was thus the most consequential of any modern American ambassadorship. It was observed twenty years later that "Every so often, there comes to light a document revealing the foresight of a public servant who grasped the full consequences and implications of a particular government measure or policy. Such a document was written in the spring of 1991 by the then U.S.Ambassador to Mexico, John Negroponte." Another commentator noted the subsequent proliferation of Negroponte's vision in other free trade agreements. He officiated at the block-long, fortified embassy where he liberalized visa practices.

Ambassador to the UN (2001–2004)
President George W. Bush appointed Negroponte to be U.S. ambassador to the United Nations in February 2001, and after substantial opposition from Senate Democrats the nomination was ratified by the Senate on September 15, 2001, four days after the September 11, 2001 attacks on the United States.  According to CBS News:

At the United Nations, Negroponte, 64, was instrumental in winning unanimous approval of a Security Council resolution that demanded Saddam Hussein comply with U.N. mandates to disarm.

During Colin Powell's speech to the Security Council on Iraqi weapons of mass destruction, Negroponte could be seen sitting behind Powell's left shoulder. Negroponte, however, had warned the Bush Administration about the adverse consequences of intervening in Iraq.

In the New York Review of Books, Stephen Kinzer reported that the messages sent by nominating Negroponte were that "the Bush administration will not be bound by diplomatic niceties as it conducts its foreign policy."  A State Department official told him that "Giving him this job is a way of telling the UN: 'We hate you.'"

Ambassador to Iraq (2004–2005)

On April 19, 2004, Negroponte was nominated by U.S. President George W. Bush to be the United States Ambassador to Iraq after the June 30 transfer of sovereignty to the new Iraqi government. He was confirmed by the United States Senate on May 6, 2004, by a vote of 95 to 3, and was sworn in on June 23, 2004, replacing L. Paul Bremer as the U.S.'s highest ranking American civilian in Iraq. He advised the Bush administration that security had to precede reconstruction in Iraq, organized a peaceful election, and gave advice, equally unwelcome to Secretary Rumsfeld and Democrats in Congress, that a five-year commitment would be required.

Director of National Intelligence (2005–2007)

On February 17, 2005, President George W. Bush named Negroponte as the first Director of National Intelligence, (DNI), a cabinet-level position charged with coordinating the nation's Intelligence Community.  On April 21, 2005, Negroponte was confirmed by a vote of 98 to 2 in the Senate, and subsequently sworn into the office that was called "substantially stronger" than its predecessor position, the Director of Central Intelligence. Part of its power stemmed from the ability to "determine" budgets, prompting President Bush to remark, "That's why John Negroponte is going to have a lot of influence.  He will set the budgets." The budget of the Intelligence Community is estimated at $40 billion.

A memorandum in the Federal Register signed May 5, 2006. by President Bush states that Negroponte, as intelligence czar, be delegated the authority to exempt companies from accurate accounting standards, a power previously reserved for the chief executive under the 1934 Securities Exchange Act.

Reaction in the intelligence community to Negroponte's nomination was, according to Newsweek, "overwhelmingly positive" because he had "earned the respect of many intel professionals since those early days of the Reagan counterinsurgency." The Times noted, "if anyone can bring a semblance of unity to America's bewildering network of competing spy agencies, it is John Negroponte."

Congressional reaction was also positive.  Sen. Jay Rockefeller (D-WV), then-vice chairman of the Senate Intelligence Committee said, "I think that Ambassador Negroponte is a very sound choice. Ambassador Negroponte has served bravely and with distinction in Iraq and at the United Nations during a time of turmoil and uncertainty. He brings a record of proven leadership and strong management." Rep. Jane Harman (D-CA), then-ranking member of the House Intelligence Committee noted, "John Negroponte is a smart choice for a very important job. He's a seasoned and skilled diplomat, who has served with distinction at the United Nations and in Iraq -- and he has the full confidence of the president."

According to John MacGaffin, the CIA's former associate deputy director for clandestine operations, "This is a guy who plays hardball. He's a man who understands the whole range of counterintelligence, intelligence and covert action. They're all parts of foreign policy and protecting ourselves." "We've known for the last 40 years that what's wrong [with intelligence] is that no one's in charge," one retired CIA official told Newsweek. "For once we have a chance to do something with someone truly in charge. Negroponte's going to decide what the answer is."

As DNI, Negroponte, "embarked on an impressive array of reform efforts," with "perhaps the most transformational work ... [involving] the effort to retool the creaky electronic infrastructure of the intelligence community."

According to U.S. News & World Report, one of Negroponte's first tests was on an overbudget satellite system.  The $25 billion system, called the "Future Imagery Architecture," was created as the "foundation for the next generation of America's space-based surveillance efforts."  The reality was quite different, as it became, "a managerial nightmare – five years behind schedule and billions over budget.  Poor quality control and technical problems raised questions about whether the system would ever work properly."  Negroponte "moved decisively" and jettisoned half the classified project.

Negroponte also appointed "mission managers" – intelligence professionals focused on America's hardest targets and most looming threats.  The mission managers are focused on counterterrorism, counterproliferation, counterintelligence, Iran, North Korea, and Cuba and Venezuela. According to John McLaughlin, former Deputy Director of Central Intelligence (DDCI), the mission manager concept, "holds much promise for integrating analysis, collection and other intelligence activities."
It has also proven beneficial during potential crises. According to a senior intelligence official quoted in U.S. News & World Report, "In the days after North Korea's recent nuclear test, the DNI put mission manager and CIA veteran Joseph DeTrani at the center of the developing crisis.  Along with issuing a twice-daily intelligence summary, DeTrani served as a 'traffic cop,' coordinating analysis, briefing the White House, and tasking spies on what to target."

In a November 2006 cover story in U.S. News & World Report, it was noted that Negroponte and his office, "have made a promising start – and, remarkably, encountered an apparent willingness to embark on the necessary reforms."  Progress made included the White House approval of more than 30 DNI recommendations on improving the flow of intelligence and terrorism data to state and local authorities; requiring intelligence agencies to accept each other's clearance; "open[ing] up the analytic process to new ideas and new people" to prevent groupthink – and the creation of an analytic ombudsman; the establishment of an Open Source center, "designed to broaden the flow of ideas to analysts"; and more "red teams" to challenge conventional thinking.
Furthermore, the President's Daily Brief, the highly classified report given to the President each morning by Negroponte, once prepared solely by the Central Intelligence Agency, is now compiled from intelligence agencies across the government.  "I believe what I can bring to the community is a sense of what our most important customer is interested in," Negroponte told US News about briefing the president.

In spite of his progress leading the Intelligence Community, though, there were rumors that Negroponte wanted to move back to the field in which he spent 37 years – the State Department and Foreign Service. The rumors became official on January 5, 2007, when Negroponte announced his resignation as DNI and move to the State Department to serve as Deputy Secretary of State.

Former DDCI John McLaughlin wrote after the resignation was announced, "Negroponte must be credited with bringing a reassuring and confident demeanor to a community that had been rocked by controversy."
According to Newsweek, "Under Negroponte, the intel czar's office was praised by both congressional and executive-branch officials for greatly improving—via its National Counterterrorism Center—the sharing among relevant agencies of intelligence reports about terror threats."

U.S. Deputy Secretary of State (2007–2009)

Negroponte was sworn in as U.S. Deputy Secretary of State by President George W. Bush on February 27, 2007. He served in that position until the end of the Bush administration on January 20, 2009.

Later career

Ambassador Negroponte joined McLarty Associates, an international strategic advisory firm headquartered in Washington, D.C., in 2009. He serves on the Leadership Council of Concordia, a nonpartisan, nonprofit based in New York City focused on promoting effective public–private collaboration to create a more prosperous and sustainable future.

Negroponte was one of 50 signatories of a statement concerning 2016 Republican presidential candidate Donald Trump in which Trump was called "reckless" and stated that he would "put at risk our country's national security and well-being."

Personal life 
Negroponte speaks five languages (English, French, Greek, Spanish, and Vietnamese). He is the elder brother of Nicholas Negroponte, founder of the Massachusetts Institute of Technology's Media Lab and of the One Laptop per Child project. His brother Michel is an Emmy Award-winning filmmaker, and his other brother, George Negroponte, is an artist and was president of the Drawing Center of New York City from 2002 to 2007. Negroponte and his wife, Diana Mary Villiers (b. August 14, 1947), have five adopted children, Marina, Alexandra, John, George and Sophia, all of whom were adopted from Honduras. On February 16, 2020, Sophia Negroponte was arrested on the charge of first-degree murder for the stabbing death of a 24 year old man at an Airbnb in Rockville, Maryland. On January 3, 2023 she was convicted of second degree depraved-heart murder for what the defense said was an accident amid an alcohol-fueled argument and prosecutors claimed was a premeditated murder. Diana Negroponte testified in the trial, explaining the two had adopted their daughter while serving at the orphanage she was living in. Following the trial, John Negroponte told The Washington Post that they may appeal the conviction stating "Neither the prosecutors nor perhaps the jury took into sufficient consideration the complexities and mitigating circumstances of the case —Sophia’s past trauma and other factors that led to a very troubled existence. She’s had severe alcohol use disorder."

Negroponte and his wife were married on December 14, 1971.

Recognition
 National Security Medal
 State Department Secretary's Distinguished Service Award with gold service star (in lieu of second award)
 Lifetime Achievement Award, World Affairs Councils of America
 Raymond “Jit” Trainor Award for Distinction in the Conduct of Diplomacy, Georgetown University, Institute for the Study of Diplomacy (2005)
 Golden Plate Award of the American Academy of Achievement presented by Awards Council member President Vaira Vīķe-Freiberga of Latvia (2006)
 George F. Kennan Award for Distinguished Public Service, National Committee on American Foreign Policy (2011)
 Distinguished Service Award for the Advancement of Public Discourse on Foreign Policy, American Committees on Foreign Relations (2014)
 Walter and Leonore Annenberg Award for Excellence in Diplomacy, The American Academy of Diplomacy (2019)
 Honorary Patron of the University Philosophical Society, Trinity College, Dublin.

See also
Negroponte doctrine
The Ambassador (2005), Norwegian documentary film that examines the career of John Negroponte, focusing primarily on his time as U.S. Ambassador to Honduras in the early 1980s 
Battalion 316, Honduran army unit responsible for carrying out political assassinations and torture of suspected political opponents of the government during the 1980s
Iran–Contra affair
List of U.S. political appointments that crossed party lines

References

External links

C-SPAN Q&A interview with Negroponte, December 3, 2006

Profiles
 Profile at SourceWatch
 RightWeb profile of John Negroponte
 Profile: John Negroponte, Center for Cooperative Research
 The Negroponte File, National Security Archive
 Office of the Director of National Intelligence
 Negroponte sworn in as Intelligence Director (May 18, 2005)
 Official biography at the United Nations website
 The Negroponte File: Additional Papers, National Security Archive, updated August 12, 2005
 Biofile: John Negroponte, a biography page
 John Negroponte addresses The World Affairs Councils of America national conference, February 8, 2006 (video)
 Ambassador Negroponte Video Address at Harvard, 12/1/2006, "Global Security Challenges Facing the Intelligence Community."
 Membership at the Council on Foreign Relations
 Negroponte on China: October 2007

Favorable commentary
 What NID Needs (Fred Kaplan for Slate, February 17, 2005)
 Smearing Negroponte (Rich Lowry for National Review, February 22, 2005)
 "Bush's Cool Cold Warrior (Jan McGirk in the Independent) September 16, 2001

Criticism
 We Must Not Move On (Paul Laverty for The Guardian, April 13, 2005)
 Negroponte's Time in Honduras at Issue (Michael Dobbs for The Washington Post, March 21, 2005)
 John Negroponte's Human Rights Record Continues to Stir Debate (May I Speak Freely Media - extensive list of links to critical commentary and news articles, etc., February 2005)
 Bush hands key post to veteran of dirty wars (Duncan Campbell of The Guardian on Negroponte's past history, February 18, 2005)
 From Central America to Iraq  (Noam Chomsky for Khaleej Times, August 6, 2004)
 Our man in Honduras (Stephen Kinzer for The New York Review of Books, September 20, 2001)
 1995 Four-Part Series on Honduras in the 80s (The Baltimore Sun, June 11, 1995 – June 18, 1995)
 A carefully crafted deception (Ginger Thompson and Gary Cohn for The Baltimore Sun, June 18, 1995)
 Negroponte Makes the Most of His Post as Minister Without Portfolio (Jeff Stein for Congressional Quarterly, March 3, 2006)

|-

|-

|-

|-

|-

|-

|-

|-

1939 births
Ambassadors of the United States to Honduras
Ambassadors of the United States to Iraq
Ambassadors of the United States to Mexico
Ambassadors of the United States to the Philippines
American people of Greek descent
British emigrants to the United States
British people of Greek descent
Diplomats from London
George W. Bush administration personnel
Harvard Law School alumni
Living people 
New York (state) Republicans
Permanent Representatives of the United States to the United Nations
Phillips Exeter Academy alumni
George Washington University faculty
Elliott School of International Affairs faculty
United States Deputy Secretaries of State
United States Directors of National Intelligence
United States Foreign Service personnel
Yale University alumni
United States Deputy National Security Advisors
Villiers family
20th-century American diplomats
21st-century American diplomats
Psi Upsilon